Dawat-e-Islami is a Sunni Islamic organization based in Pakistan. It has several Islamic educational institutions around the world.

In addition to local charity efforts, Dawat-e-Islami offers online courses in Islamic studies and runs a television station, Madani Channel. It is associated with global Preaching of Peace which counters terrorism. Dawat-e-Islami was officially founded in Karachi in September 1981 by leading scholars who selected Ilyas  as its main leader.

History 

Arshadul Qaudri and Islamic scholar Shah Ahmad Noorani, since 1973 head of the Jamiat Ulema-e-Pakistan (JUP), along with other Pakistani Sunni scholars, selected Ilyas Qadri, who was the then Punjab president of Anjuman Talaba-e-Islam, JUP's youth wing, aged 23, as the head of Dawat-e-Islami at Dār-ul ´ulūm Amjadia.
Dawat-e-Islami was established initially to dilute the influence of many wahabi group and its teachings.

2nd September
2nd September is considered as the Day of Dawateislami because on this day 40 years ago Dawateislami came into being.
Dawat-e-Islami has spread into an excess of 194 nations of the globe through 26000+ workers, various volunteers and evangelists who are engendering the message of Islam in their area. The two most significant activities of Dawat-e-Islami are Madani Qafila (missionary travel) and Naik Amal (self assessment questionnaires). Followers travel for specific days to spread the message of Islam to the people. Dawat-e-Islami owns its own TV Channel known as Madani Channel. It also arranges an annual gathering of Muslim in Multan.

In October 2002, a major Pakistani English-language newspaper reported about a 3-day public gathering in the city of Multan, Pakistan which was held by Dawat-e-Islami organization and was attended by thousands of people from all parts of Pakistan and other countries. Pakistan Railways had used special trains from Karachi, Hyderabad and Nawabshah to take passengers to Multan. Ilyas Qadri spoke at the first and last sessions of the gathering.

In addition to mosques, Dawat-e-Islami has also started Dar-ul-Madinah, an Islamic school system that aims to improve conventional academic studies in conformity with Sharia.

Expansion to Europe and U.K 
Dawat-e-Islami expanded to the United Kingdom in 1995, holding its first Ijtima (weekly congregation) in Halifax. As of December 2019, it now has at least 38 properties in the United Kingdom which are used as a network of Masajid, Islamic centers, schools and/or Jamias in order to create future scholars for society. Some buildings have been completed and others are being worked upon. More than 100,000 British Muslims are in some form or the other associated with Dawat-e-Islami in UK. In 2009, a madrassa was opened in Rotherham, England, for the education of young children and adults.

Dawat-e-Islami operates twelve centers in Greece and seven in Spain. In Athens, it has association with local Sufis and has established four centers.

Annual Islamic gatherings 

Dawat-e-Islami organized an annual congregation in Multan, Pakistan until 2008, when it was discontinued for security reasons, and in Birmingham.
In 2002, around 500,000 people participated in its congregation in Multan, Pakistan.

Dawat-e-Islami planned to hold an annual congregation (Ijtema) in December 1991 in Mumbai (India). Ilyas Attar Qadri tried to cancel it, but local activists held it anyway.  A dispute about this, caused the Mumbai-based group to break away as Sunni Dawate Islami.

Madrasa-tul Madina (Basic Education System) 
In Madrasa tul Madina, children are taught how to read the Qur’an in Arabic, as well as foundational Islamic studies. Currently, Madrasa tul Madina has around 3790 branches, with approximately 169,000 boys and girls studying free of charge in these institutions.

Madani Channel 
Since 2009, Dawat-e-Islami is operating its Madani Channel, which had been launched with Urdu broadcasts but afterwards three more channels in English, Arabic and Bengali were launched. Madni Channel is free of commercial advertisements and it runs on charity and broadcasts programs to spread the true teachings of Islam and to reform the society through spiritual and moral guidance.

COVID-19 
During the COVID-19 pandemic in Pakistan, Dawat-e-Islami distributed food ration bags to needy people affected by lockdown in Pakistan. On 20 April 2020, Imran Attari said that Dawat-e-Islami had distributed 250,000 ration bags across Pakistan, including 40,000 in Karachi. The organisation had also set up blood donation centres in 13 places in Karachi.
It collected 18,000 bottles from 106 campuses across the country.

Green Pakistan 
Dawat-e-Islami started campaign for planting trees across Pakistan which aims to pollution free country. Governor Sindh Imran Ismail inaugurated monsoon tree plantation drive at Governor's House as a part of the Clean Green Pakistan Initiative in collaboration with Dawat-e-Islami Pakistan in August 2021. Green Pakistan plantation campaign covers all major cities of Pakistan and costs millions of Pakistani rupees.

Madani Home 
Faizan Global Relief Foundation (FGRF), a welfare division of Dawateislami Dawateislami, a non-profitable organization, is building a shelter home for homeless children under its project ‘Madani Home’.

See also
Jamia-tul-Madina
Faizan e Sunnat
Muhammad Ilyas Qadri

References

Notes

External links

Dawat-e-Islami Official Website
The Dawat-E-Islami Mosque on Kenilworth Road
Saeed Ajmal: Now in love with Dawat-e-Islami

 
1981 establishments in Pakistan
Islam in Bangladesh
Islam in North America
Islam in Pakistan
Islam in the United Kingdom
Islamic organizations established in 1981
Sunni organizations
Islamic organisations based in Pakistan